Ravil Iskhakovich Kashapov, мсмк (born 15 November 1956) is a Russian ultramarathon and former marathon runner. He represented the Soviet Union at the 1987 World Championships and 1988 Summer Olympics.

He is currently an assistant professor at Kama State Institute of Physical Culture, as well as vice-president of the Tatarstan Athletics Federation. He was named a Master of Sport of the USSR, International Class.

Early life
Kashapov was born on November 15, 1956 in the town of Bolgar, Spassky District, Republic of Tatarstan in Soviet Russia. He graduated from Kazan Federal University in the Volga region in 1979 with a degree in biochemistry. In his third year at the university, at 22 years old, he started training in athletics. His first coach was Hanif Mubarakzyanovich Murtazin, an Honoured Worker of Physical Culture of the Russian Federation, who convinced him to train as a runner after seeing him messing around with friends.

In 1981, he began competing at professional athletics events. That same year, he also began his career as a sports medicine professor at various universities across the country.

Career
Kashapov began running marathons in 1986. In 1987, he won the gold medal at the Soviet Union Championships, thus qualifying for the 1987 World Championships in Rome, where he finished 8th, and the 1988 Summer Olympics in Seoul. He was the only Soviet man who competed in the Olympic marathon that year, finishing in 10th place. Also that year, Kashapov won gold at the 1988 European Marathon Cup in Huy, Belgium

He started the following year with a rare appearance at the 1989 IAAF World Cross Country Championships, finishing 74th in the long race (12 km). In April, he ran a personal best 2:11:07 time to finish fourth at the 1989 World Marathon Cup in Milan. Six months later, he finished second in the Chicago Marathon, losing to Englishman Paul Davies-Hale by just under two minutes. For the second straight year, he finished second at the Fukuoka Marathon in December. In addition, he competed at two IAAF events, the World Cup (4th in the marathon) and Golden Gala.

1990 was his last year competing at the world-class level, finishing 20th at the European Athletics Championships marathon event in Split.

From 1991 to 1997, Kashapov ran in various city marathons around the world, as well as occasional shorter races, with moderate success. Running out of Tampa, he finished 6th at the 1991 Houston Marathon and 3rd at the 1992 Pittsburgh Marathon.

In the late 1990s, he started running ultramarathons, races ranging from 50 to 100 kilometres. His greatest success came in 1998, when he won first place at the Russian 100 km Championships in Moscow, 3rd in the IAU World 100 km Championships in Kochi, Japan, and 5th in the annual Comrades Marathon (87 km). He was the over 45 age category winner in each one.

Competition record

Other events

Personal bests
Outdoor
5000 metres – 13:37.26 (Pescara, 1989)
10,000 metres – 27:56.75 (Leningrad, 1988)
10 km road – 31:19 (Orlando, 1991)
Marathon – 2:11:07 (Milan, 1989)
100 km road – 6:33:05 (Winschoten, 1999)

Personal
He has two sons, Renat and Ruslan, who both run competitively as well.

References

External links
 
 Ravil Kashapov profile at Sports-Reference.com
 Ravil Kashapov profile at All-Athletics.com
 Ravil Kashapov profile at Ultramarathon Database
 Ravil Kashapov profile at Association of Road Running Statisticians
 Ravil Kashapov profile at Probeg.org

Living people
1956 births
Soviet male long-distance runners
Russian male long-distance runners
Soviet male marathon runners
Russian male marathon runners
Russian academics
Male ultramarathon runners
Olympic athletes of the Soviet Union
Athletes (track and field) at the 1988 Summer Olympics
World Athletics Championships athletes for the Soviet Union
Sportspeople from Tatarstan
Kazan Federal University alumni
Russian ultramarathon runners
Competitors at the 1986 Goodwill Games